Gamma Aquarii, or γ Aquarii, is a suspected binary star system in the constellation of Aquarius. It has an apparent visual magnitude of 3.849, making it one of the brighter members of the constellation. It is drifting closer to the Sun with a radial velocity of −16 km/s. In 1998, Olin J. Eggen included this star as a candidate member of the Hyades Supercluster.

Gamma Aquarii is the primary or 'A' component of a double star designated WDS J22217-0123. The secondary or 'B' component is UCAC2 31430071. Gamma Aquarii A's two purported components are therefore designated WDS J22217-0123 Aa and Ab. Gamma Aquarii is traditionally also called Sadachbia , a name now formally restricted to γ Aqr Aa.

Nomenclature

γ Aquarii, Latinised to Gamma Aquarii, is the system's Bayer designation. WDS J22217-0123 A is its designation in the Washington Double Star Catalog.

It bore the traditional name Sadachbia, from an Arabic expression سعد الأخبية (sa‘d al-’axbiyah), meaning "luck of the homes (tents)". In Hindi it is also called Satabhishaj (a hundred physicians); it is called Sadhayam in Tamil. In the catalogue of stars in the Calendarium of Al Achsasi Al Mouakket, this star was designated Aoul al Achbiya (أول ألأجبية - awwil al ahbiyah), which was translated into Latin as Prima Tabernaculorum, meaning the first of luck of the homes (tents). In 2016, the International Astronomical Union organized a Working Group on Star Names (WGSN) to catalogue and standardize proper names for stars. The WGSN approved the name Sadachbia for the component WDS J22217-0123 Aa on 21 August 2016, and it is now so included in the List of IAU-approved Star Names.

This star, along with Pi Aquarii (Seat), Zeta Aquarii (Sadaltager / Achr al Achbiya) and Eta Aquarii (Hydria), were al Aḣbiyah الأخبية "the Tent".

Properties
In 1978 through 1984, H. A. McAlister listed this as a spectroscopic binary star system that is unresolved by speckle interferometry, and it is listed as such in the 1991 revision of the Bright Star Catalogue. In 2008, P. P. Eggleton and A. A. Tokovinin listed it as a single star in their catalogue of multiplicity.

It presents as an A-type main sequence star with a stellar classification of A0 V, around two and a half times more massive than the Sun. It was a candidate Lambda Boötis star, suggesting it may have accreted low-metallicity circumstellar gas some time in the past. But it has since been excluded. This value gives a lower bound on the actual azimuthal velocity along the star's equator. The outer atmosphere of Gamma Aquarii is radiating energy at an effective temperature of 10,500 K, which is nearly double the temperature at the surface of the Sun. This heat is what gives Gamma Aquarii the white-hot glow of an A-type star.

References

External links
 http://aladin.u-strasbg.fr/AladinPreview?-c=22+21+39.3754-01+23+14.393&ident=*+gam+Aqr&

A-type main-sequence stars
Lambda Boötis stars
Spectroscopic binaries

Aquarius (constellation)
Aquarii, Gamma
Durchmusterung objects
Aquarii, 048
212061
110395
8518
Sadachbia